Gymnastics events were held from 30 September 2022 to 4 October 2022 at Multi- Purpose Hall, Sama Sports Complex, Vadodara.

Medal table

References

Gymnastics at multi-sport events
2022 National Games of India